"Help Me Lose My Mind" is a song by British electronic music duo Disclosure, it features the vocals from English art rock trio London Grammar. It was released as a digital download in the United Kingdom on 25 October 2013. The track is the fifth single from the duo's debut studio album, Settle (2013). The song was written by Guy Lawrence, Howard Lawrence and Hannah Reid.

Track listing

Charts

Certifications

Release history

References

External links

2013 singles
Disclosure (band) songs
London Grammar songs
Songs written by Guy Lawrence
2012 songs
Island Records singles
Songs written by Howard Lawrence
Songs written by Hannah Reid